Wild Horse Valley may refer to:

Wild Horse Valley (film), 1940 American B-Western with Bob Steele
Wild Horse Valley AVA, 1968 American Viticultural Area in Northern California